Botryllus is a genus of colonial ascidian tunicates in the family Styelidae.

Species
Species in this genus include:

 Botryllus arenaceus Monniot, 1988
 Botryllus aster Monniot, 1991
 Botryllus closionis Monniot, Monniot, Griffiths & Schleyer, 2001
 Botryllus compositus Tokioka, 1967
 Botryllus delicatus Okuyama & Saito, 2001
 Botryllus eilatensis Shenkar & Monniot, 2006
 Botryllus elegans (Quoy & Gaimard, 1834)
 Botryllus firmus Monniot & Monniot, 1996
 Botryllus gregalis (Sluiter, 1898)
 Botryllus horridus Saito & Okuyama, 2003
 Botryllus japonicus (Oka, 1931)
 Botryllus leptus Savigny, 1816
 Botryllus maeandrius (Sluiter, 1898)
 Botryllus magnus Ritter, 1901
 Botryllus mortenseni Millar, 1964
 Botryllus ovalis Monniot, 1988
 Botryllus perspicuum Herdman, 1886
 Botryllus planus (Van Name, 1902)
 Botryllus primigenus Oka, 1928
 Botryllus promiscuus Okuyama & Saito, 2002
 Botryllus puniceus Saito & Nagasawa, 2003
 Botryllus renierii (Lamarck, 1815)
 Botryllus rosaceus Savigny, 1816
 Botryllus scalaris Saito & Mukai, 1981
 Botryllus schlosseri (Pallas, 1766)
 Botryllus separatus Sluiter, 1904
 Botryllus sexiensis Saito & Watanabe, 1981
 Botryllus stewartensis Brewin, 1958
 Botryllus stuhlmanni Michaelsen, 1918
 Botryllus tabori Rodrigues, 1962
 Botryllus tuberatus Ritter & Forsyth, 1917

References

Stolidobranchia
Tunicate genera
Taxa named by Joseph Gaertner